Galaxiella is a genus of Australian fish of the family Galaxiidae.

Species
There are currently 4 recognized species in this genus:
 Galaxiella munda McDowall, 1978 (Mud minnow)
 Galaxiella nigrostriata (Shipway, 1953) (Black-stripe minnow)
 Galaxiella pusilla (Mack, 1936) (Dwarf galaxias)
 Galaxiella toourtkoourt R. A. Coleman & Raadik, 2015 (Little galaxias)

References

 

Freshwater fish genera